Red Haw State Park is a state park of Iowa, USA, surrounding  Red Haw Lake.  It is in Lucas County near Chariton.

On March 5, 2022, an EF3 tornado made a path through Red Haw State Park, resulting in one death and one injury, as well as considerable damage to structures and trees.

References

External links
 Red Haw State Park

State parks of Iowa
Protected areas of Lucas County, Iowa